Mohammad Namazi was the founder of Namazi Hospital, which he founded in 1955 in Shiraz, Iran.
He was born in Kazerun, in 1896. He was a successful merchant who lived in the USA for many years. He died in 1973.

Life 
Namazi was born in Shiraz. He spent his childhood in China and India, and his youth in Tehran and Shiraz. In 1924, he traveled to America, and stayed there for more than 30 years. After a very successful economic career, he returned to Iran. He noticed the poor quality of the drinking water in Shiraz and in 1952 devoted part of his wealth to establishing a water supply network in the region. In 1955 he founded and equipped Namazi hospital as a teaching hospital.

At the age of 76, he died in the hospital he founded.

References

External links 
Introduction to the late Mohammad Namazi – Namazi Charity Foundation

Iranian businesspeople
Iranian philanthropists
Year of birth missing
Year of death missing
People from Kazerun
20th-century Iranian people